Jeannie Seely is a studio album by American country music artist Jeannie Seely. The album was released in 1990 on Faux Paw Productions and Shadpoke Records. The album was produced by Seely as well. The project was Seely's first studio album in eight years and second eponymous album to be released. It would be one of several studio records she would record during the 1990s.

Background and release
Jeannie Seely was recorded between 1989 and 1990. It was the first album to be produced by Seely herself. Some of her future releases would also be self-produced. The album consisted of ten tracks. Among the album's tracks was a re-recording of "Don't Touch Me", Seely's signature song. It was the second time that Seely had re-recorded the tune. Another track on the album was a cover version of Michael Bolton's hit "When I'm Back on My Feet Again". Another song on the album, "Healing Hands of Time", was composed by Willie Nelson. The project also included six tracks that were written or co-written by Seely.

Jeannie Seely was released in 1990 on Faux Paw Productions and Shadpoke Productions. These two companies had been founded by Seely. The album was released as a cassette with five songs on each side of the device. The album marked Seely's first studio release in eight years and second eponymous album to be issued. The album did not produce any known singles nor did it reach any peak positions on the Billboard music charts.

Track listing

Personnel
All credits are adapted from the liner notes of Jeannie Seely.

 Jeannie Seely – lead vocals, producer

Release history

References

1990 albums
Albums produced by Jeannie Seely
Jeannie Seely albums